Edison is a city in Calhoun County, Georgia, United States. Per the 2020 census, the population was 1,230. The Edison Commercial Historic District is listed on the National Register of Historic Places.

History
The Georgia General Assembly incorporated the place in 1902 as the "Town of Edison". The community was named after Thomas Edison (1847–1931), American inventor.

Geography
Edison is located in northwestern Calhoun County at  (31.560891, -84.737984).

Demographics

2020 census

Note: the US Census treats Hispanic/Latino as an ethnic category. This table excludes Latinos from the racial categories and assigns them to a separate category. Hispanics/Latinos can be of any race.

2000 Census
As of the census of 2000, there were 1,340 people, 512 households, and 334 families residing in the city. The racial makeup of the city was 31.94% White, 67.69% African American, and 0.37% from two or more races. Hispanic or Latino of any race were 1.27% of the population.

There were 512 households, out of which 31.4% had children under the age of 18 living with them, 34.2% were married couples living together, 28.1% had a female householder with no husband present, and 34.6% were non-families. 32.2% of all households were made up of individuals, and 16.6% had someone living alone who was 65 years of age or older.  The average household size was 2.46 and the average family size was 3.13.

In the city, the population was spread out, with 27.5% under the age of 18, 8.9% from 18 to 24, 22.3% from 25 to 44, 20.4% from 45 to 64, and 21.0% who were 65 years of age or older.  The median age was 38 years. For every 100 females, there were 74.0 males.  For every 100 females age 18 and over, there were 62.0 males.

The median income for a household in the city was $19,191, and the median income for a family was $23,839. Males had a median income of $22,500 versus $15,813 for females. The per capita income for the city was $10,409.  About 31.2% of families and 34.2% of the population were below the poverty line, including 49.9% of those under age 18 and 24.4% of those age 65 or over.

Education
The Calhoun County School System includes Calhoun County High School-Middle School, which serves Calhoun County and some students from the cities of Arlington, Edison, Leary, and Morgan. Calhoun County Elementary School is in Arlington.

Notable person
 Bobby Dews, former infielder and former coach in Major League Baseball Rodney Dent retired NBA player for the Orlando Magic’s

References

Further reading
Martha Hoover Dozier, Against Oblivion: History of Calhoun County

Cities in Calhoun County, Georgia
Cities in Georgia (U.S. state)